The Last Tomahawk or The Last of the Mohicans is a 1965 Western adventure film directed by Harald Reinl and starring Joachim Fuchsberger, Karin Dor and Marie France. It was a co-production between France, Spain and West Germany. It is loosely based on James Fenimore Cooper's 1826 novel The Last of the Mohicans, with the setting moved forward more than a century to the American West of the post-Civil War-era. Another version Fall of the Mohicans was made the same year.

It was shot at the Spandau Studios in Berlin and on location in Andalucia. The film's sets were designed by the art director Hans Jürgen Kiebach.

Cast
Joachim Fuchsberger as Captain Bill Hayward
Karin Dor as Cora Munroe
Marie France as Alice Munroe
Carl Lange as Colonel Munroe
Ricardo Rodríguez as Magua
Kurt Großkurth as Koch
Daniel Martín as Unkas
Anthony Steffen as Falkenauge
Mariano Alcón as Tamenund
Frank Braña as Corporal
Mike Brendel as Chingachgook
Stelio Candelli as Roger
Carlos Deschamps as Jackson
Rafael Hernández as Roger's Henchman
Jean-Claude Mathieu as Matt
Ángel Ter as Jeff

References

External links

1965 Western (genre) films
German Western (genre) films
Spanish Western (genre) films
Italian Western (genre) films
1960s historical adventure films
German historical adventure films
Spanish historical adventure films
Italian historical adventure films
West German films
Films directed by Harald Reinl
Films based on The Last of the Mohicans
Films set in the 1860s
Films shot in Almería
Constantin Film films
Films shot at Spandau Studios
1960s German films
1960s Italian films
1960s German-language films
German-language Italian films